George Bull  (23 August 1929 – 6 April 2001) was an English translator, author and journalist.

Education
Bull attended Wimbledon College before reading History at Brasenose College, Oxford.

Career

Journalism
Bull worked for the Financial Times, McGraw-Hill World News and for the Director magazine, of which he was editor-in-chief until 1984. He was appointed Director of the Anglo-Japanese Economic Institute in 1986. He was a director of Central Banking Publications and the founder and publisher of the quarterly publications Inside Japan and International Minds.

Translations
He translated six volumes for the Penguin Classics series: Benvenuto Cellini's Autobiography, The Book of the Courtier by Castiglione,  Lives of the Artists by Vasari (two volumes), The Prince by Machiavelli (1961), and Pietro Aretino's Selected Letters. His translation of The Prince, though discontinued by Penguin, continues to be praised as the "most stylistically elegant" in English.

He was also Consultant Editor to the Penguin Business Series.

Authorship
His other books include Vatican Politics; Bid for Power (with Anthony Vice), a history of take-over bids; Renaissance Italy, a book for children; Venice: The Most Triumphant City; Inside the Vatican and Michelangelo; A Biography.

Honours
Bull was elected a Fellow of the Royal Society of Literature in 1981 and a Vice-President of the British-Italian Society in 1994. He was awarded an OBE in 1990. George Bull was made Knight Commander of the Order of St Gregory in 1999, and was awarded the Order of the Sacred Treasure, Gold rays with Neck Ribbon (Japan) in 1999.

References

External links
George Bull OBE 1929 - 2001 An appreciation of George Bull given by Mr Kevin Grant at the Chesterton Society reception at the House of Lords (19 September 2001)
Obituary in The Independent (11 April 2001)
Translated Penguin Book – at  Penguin First Editions reference site of early first edition Penguin Books.

1929 births
2001 deaths
Alumni of Brasenose College, Oxford
English male journalists
Fellows of the Royal Society of Literature
Italian–English translators
Knights Commander of the Order of St Gregory the Great
Officers of the Order of the British Empire